Berekum is one of the constituencies represented in the Parliament of Ghana. It elects one Member of Parliament (MP) by the first past the post system of election. Berekum is located in the Berekum district  of the Brong Ahafo Region of Ghana. Brekum has been divided into Brekum East Municipal and Brekum West District.

Boundaries
The seat is located within the Berekum District of the Brong Ahafo Region of Ghana.

Members of Parliament

Elections

See also
List of Ghana Parliament constituencies

References 

Parliamentary constituencies in the Brong-Ahafo Region